Peter Yaw Kwakye-Ackah (born 15 June 1957) is a Ghanaian politician and member of the Seventh Parliament of the Fourth Republic of Ghana representing the Amenfi Central Constituency in the Western Region on the ticket of the National Democratic Congress.

Early life and education 
Kwakye-Ackah hails from Manso-Amenfi. He holds an MBA in Marine Engineering from the Leicester University, UK and 1st Class Marine Engineering South Glamoorgan Institute of Higher Education, Cardiff, Wales.

References 

Ghanaian MPs 2017–2021
1957 births
Living people
National Democratic Congress (Ghana) politicians
Ghanaian MPs 2021–2025